Ian Wild (born March 13, 1990) is a professional Canadian football linebacker who is currently a free agent. Most of his professional career was played with the Winnipeg Blue Bombers. He played college football at Mercyhurst.

Early life
Wild attended Baldwin High School.

College career
Wild played both football and lacrosse at Mercyhurst. He was roommates with BB, TR, MM, JB, GK, and AT #4009boys.

Professional career
After going undrafted in the 2012 NFL draft, Wild signed with the Buffalo Bills. He was released on May 14, 2012 without making it through training camp.

Wild signed with the Winnipeg Blue Bombers prior to the 2013 season. On August 22, 2014, Wild set a franchise record with 14 tackles against the Montreal Alouettes. He served as Winnipeg's long snapper. In his first two years with the Blue Bombers, Wild put up a total of 136 tackles, 27 special teams tackles, 4 sacks, 5 forced fumbles, and a touchdown. On January 23, 2015, Winnipeg released Wild so he could go to the NFL.

On January 31, 2015, Wild signed with the Pittsburgh Steelers. He recorded 7 tackles and a sack in the preseason, but was released during final cuts.

On September 21, 2015, Wild returned to the Winnipeg Blue Bombers for a partial season. Wild signed with Winnipeg again for 2016. His 2017 was limited to 5 games, but he returned from injury to play in the post season. On January 8, 2018, Wild re-signed a one year contract with the Winnipeg Blue Bombers. During his 6th season, Wild's contributions declined to mostly special teams play, although he did see significant action in the final game of the year when starters were resting, as well as usage in the postseason. In 15 games in 2018, Wild produced 12 tackles on defense and 12 tackles on special teams, but was released during the offseason.

In February 2019, Wild signed with the Toronto Argonauts. In 12 games interrupted by stints on the injured list, Wild produced 57 tackles and forced 2 fumbles. Additionally, he set a career high for special teams tackles, with 15.

References

External links
 Argonauts bio
 Bio

1990 births
Living people
American football linebackers
American football long snappers
American football safeties
Canadian football linebackers
Canadian football long snappers
American players of Canadian football
Mercyhurst Lakers football players
Winnipeg Blue Bombers players
Sportspeople from Pittsburgh
Players of American football from Pittsburgh
Players of Canadian football from Pittsburgh
Mercyhurst Lakers men's lacrosse players
Pittsburgh Steelers players
Buffalo Bills players
Toronto Argonauts players
Lacrosse players from Pennsylvania
American expatriate sportspeople in Canada